Zoe Caroline Brettell (née Bieler; born June 11, 1950) is a Canadian cultural anthropologist known for her scholarship on migration and gender.  

Brettell is the University Distinguished Professor of Anthropology at Southern Methodist University, where she was previously the Dedman Professor and Ruth Collins Altshuler Professor. At SMU, Brettell has served as the Chair of the Department of Anthropology (1994–2004) and the interim Dean of the Dedman College of Humanities and Sciences. She has also been president of both the Society for the Anthropology of Europe (1996–1998) and the Social Science History Association (2000–2001).  

In 2017, she was elected as a fellow of the American Academy of Arts and Sciences.

Brettell received a Bachelor of Arts in Latin American studies from Yale University in 1971. She completed her Ph.D. in anthropology at Brown University in 1978.

Books
 Men Who Migrate, Women Who Wait: Population and History in a Portuguese Parish. Princeton University Press, 1986.
 When They Read What We Write: The Politics of Ethnography (Editor). Praeger,  1996.
 Writing against the Wind: A Mother's Life History. Rowman & Littlefield Publishers, 1999.
 Migration Theory: Talking Across Disciplines (Co-edited with James F. Hollifield). Routledge, 2000.
 Citizenship, Political Engagement, and Belonging: Immigrants in Europe and the United States (Co-edited with Deborah Reed-Danahay). Rutgers University Press, 2008.
 Spaces of Identity: Constructing and Contesting Belonging Among Children of Immigrants (Co-edited with Faith Nibbs). Vanderbilt University Press, 2015.

References

1950 births
Living people
Southern Methodist University faculty
American anthropologists
Brown University alumni